Yevgeni Vladimirovich Kirisov (born 14 February 1994) is a Russian footballer.

Career
He made his professional debut in the Russian Professional Football League for FC Domodedovo Moscow on 12 July 2014 in a game against FC Spartak-2 Moscow.

In March 2015, Kirisov signed a short-term contract with Tippeligaen side Stabæk. Apart from a minor outing in the 2015 Norwegian Football Cup, he did not play any first-team games and was released in the summer.

He made his Russian Football National League debut for FC Luch-Energiya Vladivostok on 11 March 2016 in a game against FC Spartak-2 Moscow.

On 19 February 2021, Lori FC announced the signing of Kirisov.

Career statistics

References

External links
 
 

1994 births
Footballers from Moscow
Living people
Russian footballers
Association football midfielders
Russia youth international footballers
Russia under-21 international footballers
Stabæk Fotball players
FC Luch Vladivostok players
FC Volgar Astrakhan players
FC Lokomotiv Moscow players
FC Belshina Bobruisk players
FC Lori players
Russian First League players
Russian Second League players
Belarusian Premier League players
Belarusian First League players
Armenian Premier League players
Russian expatriate footballers
Expatriate footballers in Norway
Russian expatriate sportspeople in Norway
Expatriate footballers in Belarus
Russian expatriate sportspeople in Belarus
Expatriate footballers in Armenia
Russian expatriate sportspeople in Armenia